Pristina Municipality (Serbian: Opština Priština, Serbian Cyrillic: Општина Приштина) is a municipality in the district of Pristina in Kosovo.

Demography 

The Kosovo Agency of Statistics (ASK) estimated the municipality's population in 2011 at 198,897. As of the 2011 Census, in terms of ethnicity, the municipality was 97.77% Albanian, 1.08% Turkish, 0.28% Ashkali, 0.22% Serbian, 0.2% Bosniak, 0.1% Gorani and 0.03% Romani. By language, 98.09% spoke Albanian as a first language. Other spoken languages were Turkish (1.04%), Serbian (0.25%) and Romani (0.03%). By religion, there were 193,474 (97.27%) Muslims, 1,170 (0.59%) Roman Catholics, 480 (0.24%) Orthodox, 344 (0.17%) of other religions and 660 (0.33%) irreligious.

Notes

References 

Pristina